Girling is a surname. Notable people with the surname include: 

 Barry Girling (1858–1948), Welsh rugby player
 Frank Aldous Girling (1898-1966), English farmer, photographer and amateur archaeologist
 Julie Girling (born 1956), MEP for South West England; Conservative Party then independent
 Mary Girling (1827–1886), English religious leader
 Richard Girling, British journalist
 William Girling (1882–1973), New Zealand Reform Party Member of Parliament

See also
 A car component factory, Girling, named after Albert H. Girling.